Aechmea cymosopaniculata is a plant species in the genus Aechmea. This species is endemic to the Aragua region of Venezuela.

References

cymosopaniculata
Flora of Venezuela
Plants described in 1865
Endemic flora of Venezuela
Taxa named by John Gilbert Baker